The Gregory Tsamblak State University is a public university located in Taraclia, Moldova.

History
The University was opened on 1 October 2004. The then President of Moldova Vladimir Voronin and the President of Bulgaria Georgi Parvanov attended the inaugural ceremony. In 2019, Moldovan President Igor Dodon assured Bulgarian President Rumen Radev that the Moldovan side will transform the university into a branch of the Bulgarian University of Ruse.

Courses 
The university offers both undergraduate and postgraduate courses. Some of the topics taught at this university are—
 Bulgarian language and literature and Romanian language and literature;
 Romanian Language and Literature and English Language and Literature;
 Pedagogy of primary education;
 Music;
 History;
 Social protection services;
 Accounting;
 Preschool Pedagogy and the Romanian language and literature.

References

External links 
 

Universities in Moldova
Educational institutions established in 2004
2004 establishments in Moldova
Taraclia District